Clarence Junior Bitang  (sometimes referred to as Clarence Batang; born September 2, 1992) is a Cameroonian footballer who plays for Saudi Arabian club Hajer as a midfielder.

Career
Bitang played in Cameroon, Thailand and Greece before coming to Macedonia. He debuted for Cameroon national football team in 2017.

In February 2018, Bitang signed for FK Vardar.

On 1 August 2019, Bitang signed for FC Kaisar.

On 18 January 2023, Bitang joined Hajer.

Honours

Buriram PEA
Thai Premier League (1): 2011
Thai FA Cup (1) : 2011
Thai League Cup (1): 2011

References

External links
 Soccerway Profile
 

1992 births
Living people
Footballers from Douala
Cameroonian footballers
Cameroon international footballers
Cameroonian expatriate footballers
Cameroonian expatriate sportspeople in Thailand
Cameroonian expatriate sportspeople in Greece
Cameroonian expatriate sportspeople in Kazakhstan
Cameroonian expatriate sportspeople in Saudi Arabia
Expatriate footballers in Thailand
Expatriate footballers in Greece
Expatriate footballers in North Macedonia
Expatriate footballers in Kazakhstan
Expatriate footballers in Saudi Arabia
Les Astres players
Clarence Bitang
Clarence Bitang
Paniliakos F.C. players
Olympiacos Volos F.C. players
Agrotikos Asteras F.C. players
FK Vardar players
FC Kaisar players
Hajer FC players
Association football midfielders
Macedonian First Football League players
Kazakhstan Premier League players
Saudi First Division League players
Cameroon A' international footballers
2018 African Nations Championship players
Cameroonian expatriate sportspeople in North Macedonia
Cameroonian expatriate sportspeople in Jordan
Al-Wehdat SC players
Expatriate footballers in Jordan